The Weir Rose Bowl is a New Zealand competition for Under 12 girls and boys in the Auckland, Northern and Waikato Bay of Plenty districts.  Teams are selected from the regional Football Talent Centres of the Northern, Waikato Bay of Plenty and Auckland Football Federations.

The tournament is named after Tom Weir who donated the trophy in 1954.

Due to the big growth in girls playing football a girls competition was added in 2003. The 2015 finals was Auckland against Waikato (boys) and Western Bay against Auckland

Winners

Girls Competitions

Golden Boot

Boys Competitions

Association football competitions in New Zealand